Lebong is a regency of Bengkulu Province, Indonesia, on the island of Sumatra. It covers an area of 1,665.28 km2, and had a population of 97,091 at the 2010 Census and 106,293 at the 2020 Census. Contrary to the popularly believe that the town of Muara Aman is the seat of the government of Lebong, regency's capital is actually located in neighboring Tubei district (previously known as Pelabai), where all the office and judiciary institution is situated. Until 1966 the district was part of South Sumatra.

Administrative districts

The Regency is divided into twelve districts (kecamatan), listed below with their areas and their populations at the 2010 Census and the 2020 Census. The table also includes the locations of the district administrative centres, and the number of villages (rural desa and urban kelurahan) in each district.

References

 
Regencies of Bengkulu